Karjasoo is a village in Põhja-Sakala Parish, Viljandi County in central Estonia, located about  west of the town of Suure-Jaani, the administrative centre of the municipality. Most of the village's territory is covered by the northern part of Kuresoo Bog which is part of the Soomaa National Park. In 2009 Karjasoo had a population of 7.

Composer, organist and folk songs collector Mart Saar (1882–1963) was born in Hüpassaare which is now part of Karjasoo village.

Gallery

References

Villages in Viljandi County
Kreis Fellin